Birds Britannia is a BBC's four-part television series about the birds of the United Kingdom, first shown from 7 to 28 November 2010 on BBC Four. It was produced by Stephen Moss.

Each of the four, sixty-minute episodes concentrates on one kind of bird: garden birds, waterbirds, seabirds and birds of the countryside.

The series has no presenter, and is narrated by the Scottish actor Bill Paterson, with filmed interviews with a wide range of experts and bird enthusiasts, including David Attenborough, Mark Cocker, Jeremy Mynott, Tim Birkhead, Jane Fearnley-Whittingstall, Christopher Frayling, Kate Humble, Rob Lambert, Desmond Morris, David Lindo, Helen Macdonald, Andrew Motion, Tony Soper, and Bill Oddie.

It has been announced that a book of the same title, by Stephen Moss, will be published by  Collins in April 2011.

See also
 Birds Britannica, a book by Cocker and Richard Mabey
 List of Britannia documentaries

References

External links
 
 
 BBC Natural History blog entry by producer Stephen Moss
 Garden birds video clips from Birds Britannia on BBC Nature

BBC television documentaries
2010s British documentary television series
Nature educational television series
2010 British television series debuts
2010 British television series endings
English-language television shows
Birds in the United Kingdom
Films about birds